Shut Up Kitty: A Cyber-Based Covers Compilation is a various artists compilation album released on November 5, 1993, by Re-Constriction Records.

Reception
Aiding & Abetting gave Shut Up Kitty: A Cyber-Based Covers Compilation a somewhat positive review, saying "a lot of this is pretty cool, especially when songs are just completely deconstructed" while criticizing some lackluster material.

Track listing

Personnel
Adapted from the Shut Up Kitty: A Cyber-Based Covers Compilation liner notes.
 Chase – compiling, design
 Jim Woodring – cover art

Release history

References

External links 
 Shut Up Kitty: A Cyber-Based Covers Compilation at Discogs (list of releases)

1993 compilation albums
Alternative rock compilation albums
Industrial metal compilation albums
Industrial rock compilation albums
Re-Constriction Records compilation albums